William C. Widenor was an American historian.

Life
Widenor was born on December 15, 1937, in Easton, Pennsylvania. Widenor attended Princeton University after graduating from high school. After attending the Foreign Service, he met Mary Helen Barrett in Zurich. The two married in 1964, and moved to Berkeley, California in 1968. At Berkeley, Widenor pursued a doctorate in History. In 1973, Widenor and Barrett divorced. After receiving his PhD, Widenor then took an assistant professor position at the University of Illinois.  Widenor died on January 13, 2017, in Champaign, Illinois.

Widenor was professor emeritus at University of Illinois.

Awards
 1981 Frederick Jackson Turner Award

Works
 
 "Henry Cabot Lodge: The Astute Parliamentarian." First Among Equals: Outstanding Senate Leaders of the Twentieth Century, edited by Richard A. Baker and Roger H. Davidson, pp. 38–62. Washington: Congressional Quarterly, 1991.

References

External links
"Book Department", The Annals of the American Academy of Political and Social Science, Vol. 455, No. 1, 201-202 (1981), DOI 10.1177/000271628145500147 

21st-century American historians
21st-century American male writers
Living people
University of Illinois faculty
Year of birth missing (living people)
American male non-fiction writers